News Gal is a TV series produced by the DuMont Television Network, and shown on both DuMont and ABC.

Broadcast history
News Gal was produced by DuMont in 1951, and shown on ABC as Your Kaiser Dealer Presents Kaiser-Frazer "Adventures In Mystery" Starring Betty Furness In "Byline" from November 4 to December 9, 1951, and again in syndication in the fall of 1957.

The show starred Betty Furness, Barry Kelley, and Mark Stevens and was reportedly shown on DuMont on Saturdays at 12 noon ET for two weeks in October 1951 under the title News Gal.

Episode series
As with most DuMont series, no episodes are known to exist.

See also
List of programs broadcast by the DuMont Television Network
List of surviving DuMont Television Network broadcasts

References

Bibliography
David Weinstein, The Forgotten Network: DuMont and the Birth of American Television (Philadelphia: Temple University Press, 2004) 
Alex McNeil, Total Television, Fourth edition (New York: Penguin Books, 1980) 
Tim Brooks and Earle Marsh, The Complete Directory to Prime Time Network TV Shows, Third edition (New York: Ballantine Books, 1964)

External links
News Gal at IMDB

1951 American television series debuts
1957 American television series endings
American Broadcasting Company original programming
Black-and-white American television shows
DuMont Television Network original programming
First-run syndicated television programs in the United States